Tullus was an American biblical comic strip published from 1943 until 1976. It was created by Joseph Hughes Newton and is set in the 1st century AD.

Publication history

Tullus was first published on December 26, 1943, in the Sunday School papers What to Do, Boys' World and Girls' Companion (who were later merged into the Christian comic paper Sunday Pix). The strip was also carried by Cook's Young People's Weekly. Its original creator was Joseph Hughes Newton. The strip was later written and scripted by other artists like Brinton Turkle, Bob Magnusen and written, pencilled and inked by Al Stenzel and Irv Novick, a veteran DC artist notable for his war comics.

Concept

Tullus takes place in the 1st century AD and follows the adventures of Tullus, a young Christian Roman who travels to many places in the ancient world, including Asia Minor, Greece, and Rome.

Albums

Six collections of the Tullus comics have appeared in paperback book form, the first of these made in the 1970s by Sunday Pix publisher David C. Cook.:

 Tullus and the Monsters of the Deep
 Tullus and the Dark City
 Tullus and the Ransom Gold
 Tullus and the Vandals of the North
 Tullus in the Deadly Whirlpool
 Tullus and the Kidnapped Prince

These collections reprint later Tullus stories, which are not as prized by collectors as the earlier stories.

Reprint

In 2016, a Tullus comic book was published by Manuscript Press in both print and Kindle editions.  It is a color reprint of all of the Tullus pages from the year 1952, with a cover by Danny Frolich.

References

Christian Comics International notes on the Tullus series
Sunday Pix, incorporating Girls' Companion, Boys World, and What to Do, periodical, David C. Cook Publishing Company, Elgin, Illinois, USA, 1949 to 1976?
Tullus: Exciting adventures of a young first-century Christian, David C. Cook, editor, ASIN: B000VJWUPI

American comic strips
Christian comics
Biblical comics
Adventure comics
1943 comics debuts
1976 comics endings
Comics set in the 1st century
Comics set in the Roman Empire
Comics set in ancient Greece
Comics set in ancient Israel
Comics set in ancient Mesopotamia
Comics set in Turkey
Comics set in ancient Egypt
Fiction set in ancient Rome
Fictional religious workers
American comics characters
Comics characters introduced in 1943
Male characters in comics